The Salamansa goby (Gobius salamansa) is a species of marine fish from the family Gobiidae, the true gobies. The species was named and described by Samuel P. Iglésias and Lou Frotté in 2015. The species name salamansa refers to the type location.

References 

salamansa
Fish described in 2015
Fish of West Africa
Fauna of São Vicente, Cape Verde